Elite Squad is a 2007 Brazilian crime film based on the novel Elite da Tropa by Luiz Eduardo Soares, André Batista, and Rodrigo Pimentel. Directed by José Padilha from a screenplay by Padilha, Bráulio Mantovani, and Pimentel, the film stars Wagner Moura, Caio Junqueira, and André Ramiro. In Elite Squad, Roberto Nascimento (Moura), a Batalhão de Operações Policiais Especiais (BOPE) captain, leads a crackdown on a series of Rio de Janeiro neighbourhoods to prepare for the 1997 state visit of Pope John Paul II. 
 
Inspired by the Military Police and their related arms, Elite Squad is the second feature and first film by Padilha, after the documentary Bus 174 (2002). 

Elite Squad was an overwhelming critical and commercial success, and became a cultural phenomenon in Brazil. The film won the Golden Bear at the 2008 Berlin Film Festival. Its sequel, Elite Squad: The Enemy Within, released in Brazil on October 8, 2010, holds industry records in the country for ticket sales and gross revenue.

Plot
Roberto Nascimento, a BOPE captain, leads an operation to secure the Turano neighbourhood before Pope John Paul II's overnight visit at the Archbishop's home near the favela. With his wife Rosane pregnant, Roberto searches for a successor at the unit before switching to a desk job. 

Rookie PMERJ officers and best friends André Matias and Neto Gouveia handle menial work as instructed to them by their corrupt seniors: Neto supervises the police auto mechanic shop, whilst Matias is responsible for registering and filing police complaints in a small archive office. André also attends law school, where he begins a relationship with Maria, and meets her friends Roberta and Edu; all three are members of a NGO that operates in an area ruled by drug lord Baiano. Baiano provides marijuana to Matias' friends, who sell it on campus. André also befriends Romerito, a boy who, like himself, suffers from myopia.

Neto applies to another department, but his transfer is denied. Disgusted by corruption led by fellow officer Fabio, Neto and André steal the police's bribe money to fix as many police cars as possible. Their superior, Captain Oliveira, finds out and demotes them to kitchen work as punishment and orders Fabio - whom he believes stole from him - to meet drug traffickers at a community funk party in Morro da Babilônia to enquire about payment. 

Fabio realizes is a set-up to kill him and discreetly warns Neto and André, who rush to a vantage point at the party. They use a sniper rifle telescope to watch Oliveira and other policemen but Neto accidentally shoots, causing a deadly gunfight between the officers and thugs; as André and Neto attempt to flee the scene, Roberto and his men rescue all the officers. After the shootout, André is photographed by the press. André and Neto apply for BOPE, motivated by their honesty and devotion, and eagerness for action. At the NGO office, Baiano confronts Maria and her friends with a newspaper featuring André's picture and threatens to kill them if they bring policemen inside his territory.

BOPE training proves to be gruesome, with many candidates quitting the program, including Fabio (who applied as a way to avoid Oliveira), but both Neto and André pass; Neto celebrates by getting a BOPE tattoo on his arm. André's relationship with Maria ends and he confronts Edu, ordering him to arrange a meet with Romerito the next day to give him a pair of glasses. Edu reveals André' plan to Baiano, who sets an ambush to kill him. Neto informs André of a job interview at a law firm that will conflict with meeting Romerito, and volunteers to deliver the glasses in his place: this results in Neto being mortally wounded. When Baiano prepares to execute him, he notices his BOPE tattoo and goes into hiding for fear of retaliation.

After Neto's funeral, André, Roberto, and the men make daily incursions into Baiano's slum, torturing several dealers into revealing his whereabouts. After one of them reveals Edu tipped Baiano, Matias storms in a peace walk and violently beats Edu and insults Maria and the others. BOPE locate and corner Baiano: Roberto orders André to shoot Baiano in the face with a shotgun, as revenge for Neto's death and his final test for BOPE. As Baiano pleads, André cocks the gun and the screen cuts to black as a shot is heard.

Cast
 Wagner Moura as Roberto Nascimento - A captain in the BOPE squad, who is  awaiting a promotion that will make his job safer and enable him to spend time with his wife and newborn son. In order to move into his new position he needs to find a worthy successor.
 Caio Junqueira as Aspirant Neto Gouveia - He is a rookie police officer and Matias' best friend. Nascimento describes Neto as being similar to himself when he was younger. He is a tough man, but has a fierce temper as well, and never gives up on his mission. He later joined BOPE to seek out justice and was groomed for Nascimento's spot.
 André Ramiro as Aspirant André Matias - Another rookie police officer,  he is also a law student, who wants to specialize in criminal law. He is a resourceful and calculating tactician. He joins BOPE along with Neto Gouveia.
 Maria Ribeiro as Rosane Nascimento - Nascimento's wife. They are expecting their first child. She dislikes Nascimento's frequent absence from home and the dangers associated with his job.
 Milhem Cortaz as Capitão Fábio Barbosa - One of the captains where Matias and Neto work he develops a sort-of friendship with the two. A former pimp in Copacabana he also runs a protection racket scheme. After Matias and Neto stole the drug payoff he feared that Oliveira would blame him and have him killed.
 Fernanda Machado as Maria - A law student and founding member of the NGO, she is also a marijuana user. She befriends Matias and falls in love with him, but when Baiano finds out that he is a cop, she abandons him for lying to her and because she fears Baiano's retribution. She later helps Matias by giving him the name of Baiano's girlfriend. In the end, Matias insults her and her friends and walks away, ending their relationship.
 André Di Mauro as Pedro Rodrigues - A student who works in the favela's NGO and dates Roberta. As a punishment for bringing a cop into the drug dealer's circle of friends, Rodrigues is necklaced.
 Paulo Vilela as Edu - Nicknamed "Playboy", he is the main university drug dealer and is close to Baiano, although he is afraid of him. He despises Matias for his defense of police officers.
 Fábio Lago as Baiano - He is a ruthless drug lord who sells marijuana and heroin throughout the university using several students. Unlike many other drug lords, he hates all cops, even the corrupted ones, and avoids having business with them. Edu is his main seller on the university. He has a small auxiliary that protects the NGO.
 Marcelo Valle as Capitão Oliveira - He is Fabio's rival and superior in the police force, taking over his territory for protection rackets and later allegedly setting him up to be killed.
 Fernanda de Freitas as Roberta Alunde
 Alex Avellar, as 02
 Ricardo Pagotto Piai, as 08
 Guilherme Aguilar, as 07
 Pedro Bonfim, as PM Robson

Inspiration
The movie is based on Elite da Tropa, a book by two BOPE policemen (Batalhão de Operações Policiais Especiais - Rio de Janeiro military police squads for special actions), André Batista and Rodrigo Pimentel, together with sociologist & anthropologist Luiz Eduardo Soares, which provided a semi-fictional account of the daily routine of the BOPE as well as some historical events, based on the experiences of the two BOPE policemen. The book was controversial at the time of release, in its description of the BOPE as a "killing machine", as well as the detailed allegation of an aborted assassination attempt on then left-wing governor of Rio de Janeiro, Leonel Brizola, and reportedly resulted in Batista being reprimanded and censured by the Military Police. The writing contained some discrepancies, however Soares did not retract his novel. The novel had a unique reception when it was translated in 2010. There were many fans of the original novel and film who felt that the Portuguese-English translation was poor and did not follow the film and vice versa.  Ultimately the novel (before translation) was more like the film than the novel in English.

Production leak
In August 2007, prior to the movie's release to theaters, a preliminary cut of the film was leaked and made available for download on the Internet. The cut, which included English title cards but no subtitles, was leaked from the company responsible for subtitling the film, resulting in one person being fired and a criminal investigation. It was estimated that about 11.5 million people had seen the leaked version of the movie in 2007.

Reception

Popularity and box office
Tropa de Elite became one of the most popular Brazilian movies in history. According to Datafolha, 77% of São Paulo residents knew about the movie. The word of mouth was also important for the disclosure of the film, with 80% of the people rating the movie as "excellent" or "good", according to the same poll.
The movie was released in Rio de Janeiro and São Paulo on October 5, 2007 (with the intention of being considered by the Ministry of Culture to compete as the Brazilian entry for the Best Foreign Language Film Oscar). It was released nationwide on October 12, 2007. By January 2008, 2.5 million people had seen it in theaters. In Rio and São Paulo, with no promotion other than billboards, 180,000 people saw the movie during its opening weekend.

The movie was also the cover issue for the two Brazil's most important weekly magazines, Veja and Época. In the beginning of 2008 it was confirmed that Rede Globo would produce a TV series based on the movie. In 2011 Rockstar Games recommended Elite Squad to fans of its video game Max Payne 3, which is set in Brazil and depicts battles between special police units and favela gangs.

Outside Brazil reviews of the film were initially mixed, but after time the film was received more positively. Based on 34 reviews, the film received a 53% approval rating on Rotten Tomatoes, with its critics' consensus calling it a "brutal, action-heavy Brazilian cop film with a pointless voiceover. Lacks flair, overdoes the violence and is never quite sure where its morals lie".

Criticism
When the first version of the film leaked, it caused a major controversy for its portrayal of Captain Nascimento's unpunished police brutality in slums (favelas); some saw it as glamourizing police violence. After its exhibition in Berlin Film Festival, critic Jay Weissberg, in a Variety article, called the movie "a one-note celebration of violence-for-good that plays like a recruitment film for fascist thugs". Michel Misse, a researcher of urban violence in the Federal University of Rio de Janeiro, in an article by Carta Capital, tried to explain why some people cheered at Captain Nascimento's actions: "as the judiciary system cannot keep up with the demand for punishment, some may think civil rights leads to unpunishment. And then, they want illegal solutions. That's why Captain Nascimento is called".

Awards
On February 16, 2008, Elite Squad won the Best Movie award of the Berlin International Film Festival, the Golden Bear.

Soundtrack
The soundtrack of the film was a collection of popular hits, but even the soundtrack would not escape controversy as the Brazilian authorities demanded the removal of MC Leonardo's "Rap das Armas" from the film, because of alleged promotion of violence like use of illegal arms and drugs. The filmmakers complied two weeks after the official release.

"Rap das Armas" - Bateria da Rocinha, MC Leonardo
"Tropa de Elite" - Tihuana
"Rap da Felicidade" - MC Cidinho, MC Doca
"Passa Que é Teu" - Pedro Bromfman
"Brilhar a Minha Estrela" - Sangue da Cidade
"Kátia Flávia, a Godiva do Irajá" - Fausto Fawcett
"Teatro de Bonecos" - Guilherme Flarys, Pedro Guedes
"Polícia" - Titãs
"Invasão do BOPE" - Pedro Bromfman
"Lado B Lado A" - O Rappa
"Andando Pela África" - Barbatuques
"Nossa Bandeira"  - Bateria da Rocinha, MC Leonard
"Rap das Armas [Funk]" - MC Leonard

Sequel

A sequel, named Tropa de Elite 2: O Inimigo Agora É Outro, was released in Brazil on October 8, 2010, and in the U.S. on November 11, 2011.

See also
 Batalhão de Operações Policiais Especiais
 Bus 174
 City of God

References

External links
 
 
 Official trailer with English subtitles

2007 crime drama films
2007 films
Brazilian crime drama films
Films about the illegal drug trade
Films directed by José Padilha
Films set in 1997
Films set in Rio de Janeiro (city)
Films shot in Rio de Janeiro (city)
Golden Bear winners
2000s Portuguese-language films
Squatting in film
Works about organized crime in Brazil